Samrat Ashok Technological Institute (SATI) is a Grant-in-Aid Autonomous college in Vidisha in the central Indian state of Madhya Pradesh. It was established by Late Maharaja Jiwajirao Scindia on November 1st  1960, with a donation from Gangajali Trust fund. It is an autonomous institute, which is funded by Government of Madhya Pradesh and managed by the Maharaja Jiwaji Rao Education Society chaired by Hon'ble Shrimant Jyotiraditya Madhavrao Scindia.
The institute started with degree courses in Civil Engineering, Mechanical Engineering & Electrical Engineering. The institute now offers nine full-time and six Part-time undergraduate courses leading to the degree in Bachelor of Engineering (B.E.) and sixteen Postgraduate courses in the areas of Engineering, Science and Management. The college campus is spread over an area of 85 acres of lush green land with natural surroundings.

Background

Samrat Ashok Technological Institute is located at Vidisha, a town in the central Indian state of Madhya Pradesh. It was established on 1st November 1960 under the "Open Door" policy of Government of India by Maharaja Jiwajirao Education Society Vidisha, with a donation from the Gitanjali Trust Fund of the Scindias, (the erstwhile rulers of Gwalior state), and commitment of non-recurring grants from the Government of India and Government of Madhya Pradesh in agreed proportions.

The foundation of the Institute was laid down by late Pt. Jawaharlal Nehru, Hon'ble Prime Minister of India on 13 February 1962. The institute was inaugurated by late Dr.Rajendra Prasad, Hon'ble President of India.

Initially the institute was affiliated to Vikram University Ujjain to which three other colleges in the region namely MACT Bhopal (now MANIT), Shri Govindram Seksaria Institute of Technology and Science Indore and MITS Gwalior were also affiliated at that time.

After the establishment of Bhopal university at Bhopal (now Barkatullah University) the institute was affiliated to it along with MACT Bhopal and GEC Bhopal.

SATI is academically and administratively an autonomous institute, however, it is a part of the Rajiv Gandhi Proudyogiki Vishwavidyalaya also known as RGPV Bhopal from 1998 and its degrees are issued by this university.

The institute was named after the emperor Ashoka the great who was the governor of the emperor Chandragupta Maurya in Ujjain and Vidisha (formally known Bhelsa). He married Devi, daughter of a businessman of Vidisha.

In March 2016, the institution received NAAC certification. Also the government of India has selected this institute under the world bank scheme TEQIP-III (Technical Education Quality Improvement Program -III) for a financial assistance of Rs-15 crores, after TEQIP-I and TEQIP-II. The objective of this scheme is to establish academic excellence in the institute through various activities and enhance the employment opportunities of undergraduate and post-graduate students.

Campus 

The college campus is a few minutes (approximately 4–5 minutes) walk from Vidisha railway station. It is situated in the civil lines area near the industrial state of Vidisha. It spreads over 85 acres of lush green land with well maintained approach roads, playgrounds, and gardens, etc. The campus has Engineering and Polytechnic College. It has six hostels, three boys' hostels, and three girls' hostels. The campus also has quarters for professors and employees.

Facilities 
 Cooperative store
 State Bank of India bank, ATM, and Indian Post office
 Dispensary; Institute has tie-up with a hospital.
 Kailash Satyarthi Auditorium
 Guest house
 Alumni Transit Home
 Canteen
 Central Reprographic Center
 Kiosk centre

Sport facilities 
 Well-maintained cricket and football ground
 Two tennis courts
 A concrete basketball court and skating rink
 Two indoor wooden badminton courts
 Well-equipped gymnasium

Courses 

Full-time and part-time Undergraduate Programs

 B.Tech	Civil Engineering - 60 seats
 B.Tech	Computer Science & Engineering - 120 seats
 B.Tech	Electronics & Communication Engineering - 60 seats
 B.Tech	Electrical Engineering - 60 seats
 B.Tech	Electronics & Instrumentation Engineering -120 seats
 B.Tech	Mechanical Engineering- 120 seats
 B.Tech        Internet of things - 60 seats
 B.Tech        Artificial intelligence & Data science - 60 seats
Part-Time Bachelor of Engineering (B.E.) Courses (4 Year Duration) for Serving Self Employed Diploma Holders. 	

NOTE: As of 2019 Biomedical engineering and petrochemical engineering B.tech/B.E. are no longer available and departments were merged with E & I and Mechanical department respectively. 
From the academic year 2020, two new programs namely the Internet of things(IoT) and Artificial intelligence & Data science were started.

 Full Time/ Part Time Postgraduate Programs

(A) Engineering & Technology Courses ( 4 semesters )

	M.Tech. Advance Production Systems (Mechanical) (Full Time)
	M.Tech. Construction Technology & Mgt.(Civil) (Full Time)
	M.Tech. Construction Technology & Mgt. (Civil)(Part Time)
	M.Tech.Transportation Engineering (Civil) (Full Time)
	M.Tech.Environmental Engineering (Civil) (Full Time)
	M.Tech.Power Electronics (Electrical) (Full Time)
	M.Tech.Computer Science & Engineering (CSE) (Full Time)

(B)  M.C.A. (Master of Computer Applications) ( 4 Semesters) intake of 30 seats

(C) Courses in Applied Sciences ( 4 Semesters) intake of 25 seats
	M.Sc. Applied Chemistry

(D) Management 
	M.B.A (Master of Business Administration)  ( 4 Semesters) intake of 60 seats

Ph.D. program ( full or partial ):
The Institute is approved as research center of Rajiv Gandhi Proudyogiki Vishwavidyalaya Bhopal & Barkatullah University, Bhopal for Ph.D. program in all disciplines of engineering technology, science, and management from affiliated university. Institute publishes a (research journal) SATI journal of science and technology. 
AICTE has approved this institute as a QIP research center for Ph.D. in engineering and technology in civil, mechanical, Electrical, CS, IT with two seats each.

D.Sc. Program
Institute has approved as a research center of Barkatullah University Bhopal for the D.Sc program.

Educational facilities

Laboratories 
The institute has the latest laboratories in all the science and engineering departments capable of catering to the needs of both undergraduate and postgraduate courses. In recent years, these laboratories have been extensively modernized with the help of a grant from government of India.

Computer facilities 
Apart from a well-established computer centre catering to the needs of B.Tech. (computer science and engineering/information technology), each department has its own computer lab. Likewise, the applied mathematics department, which runs a fully-fledged advanced course of M.Sc. in computer science, has developed its own computer center. There is a central state-of-the-art computer center with the latest computer systems with multiple environments of computing and 100 Mbit/s NKN Internet connectivity with round-the-clock accessibility to staff and students. All the departments connected under network 6.3 central workshop.

Central workshop 
Shops have been extensively modernized to cater to the needs of fabrication works involved in student projects and have very modern metrology laboratory for precision measurement.

Central library 
The library has a rich collection of text and reference books related to engineering, management, and science. It has more than 70,000 volumes with educational videos and CDs covering various subjects and subscriptions of more than 100 national and international journals. The library provides open access system facility(OPSF) to all its users. It also provides user-friendly online public access catalogue(OPAC) facilities to make easy access to all its contents. The institute has consortium membership of INDEST AICTE new Delhi and INFLIBNET Ahmedabad through the central library. Institute library has subscription to various e-journal databases e.g., science direct, Open J-Gate, IET Digital Library, American Institute of Physics, American Physical Society, Cambridge University Press, Indian Journal, Oxford University Press, Royal Society of Chemistry, Institute of Physics, Bhubaneswar, etc.

Clubs 
 Innovation Club FLUX- Club to promote innovation and research among the students and help them to do it through activities, workshops, and projects.
 Startup Incubation center- To nurture the startup atmosphere in the college, some of the notable startups are BhangaarChand, Knock For Books, Minchuu
 MIRAGE-Capturing Beyond Vision- Official Photography and Cinematography Club, works for the sake of interested and talented photographers of college.
 Aagaz Theatre Club
 E-Cell
 Rudraksha Dance Club
 Club 'O' E
 Udaan Dramatics club
 FIAT Club

Alumni 
 Kailash Satyarthi, Nobel Peace Prize laureate, 2014, as a graduating student of the University of Bhopal, renamed in 1988 as Barkatullah University.
 P. B. Sharma, vice-chancellor, Amity University, Gurgaon, and former vice-chancellor, Delhi Technological University
 Padma Shri V. K. Chaturvedi, former chairman and managing director, Nuclear Power Corporation of India
 Pratap Bhanu Sharma, former member of parliament, Vidisha
 Harneet Singh, CEO, Domino’s Pizza

See also 
 List of engineering colleges in Madhya Pradesh
 Vidisha

References

External links 
 

All India Council for Technical Education
Vidisha
Engineering colleges in Madhya Pradesh
Education in Bhopal
Universities and colleges in Madhya Pradesh